The Kia Sportage is a lineup of sport utility vehicles manufactured by the South Korean manufacturer Kia since 1993 through five generations. Initially a compact SUV built on a body-on-frame chassis, the second-generation Sportage transitioned to a car-based platform which placed it into the compact crossover SUV class, and has been developed alongside the Hyundai Tucson. Since the fifth-generation model launched in 2021, Kia developed the Sportage in two sizes with different wheelbase lengths for different markets.

The Sportage has been the best-selling Kia model globally since 2016 after surpassing the Rio. In 2018, the model reached the 5 million production milestone. , the Sportage is positioned between the Seltos or Niro and the three-row Sorento in Kia's SUV global lineup.



First generation (NB; 1993) 

The first-generation Kia Sportage was developed with a Mazda Bongo engineering base platform. It shares many mechanical components such as the engine, transmissions (early versions), and differentials with the Mazda line of vehicles. This was during Kia's alliance with Ford and Mazda, which involved Ford/Mazda providing technology and Kia providing inexpensive manufacturing facilities for Ford.

From 1995 to 1998, the Sportage was built by Karmann in Germany; European buyers received German-built versions in that period, while the rest of the world received South Korean-built versions. It was launched in Asia in July 1993 and European sales started two years later.

The Sportage was sold in either a five-door SUV or a three-door soft-top convertible. Kia initially developed the wagon in standard length form, but in circa 1996, the company released an extended length version.

Diesel-engined models were mostly restricted to European markets, as was the more basic single overhead camshaft (SOHC) version of the 2.0-liter FE gasoline inline-four. Delivering , this gasoline engine was available from 2000 onwards. In North America, the 2.0-liter FE DOHC engine produced  and had optional four-wheel drive. The 1997 model year Kia Sportage was the world's first production vehicle to be equipped with a knee airbag.

This first-generation model (1993–2002) sold in low numbers, even domestically in South Korea, and models after Hyundai's 1998 partial takeover of Kia (1997–2002) were recalled twice for rear wheels dismounting while driving. The first-generation Sportage was discontinued in South Korea in 2002, and in North America after the 2002 model year. By 2003, most international markets had discontinued the Sportage range, although it remained on sale in some developing countries until its second-generation replacement arrived in 2005.

The Kia Sportage scored the lowest possible result in the Australian ANCAP crash tests – one star out of five. As well as a failure of the seat belts, the vehicle structure collapsed.

Facelift

Second generation (JE/KM; 2004) 

After a two-year hiatus, the Sportage returned in model-year 2005, sharing a Hyundai Elantra-based platform with the first-generation Hyundai Tucson. A 2.0 L straight-4 diesel engine was available in the United Kingdom. Fans of the original pre-Hyundai Sportage and critics complained that it was considerably larger than the original Sportage and had none of its off-road capability, the two keys to its success. However, buyers of the second-generation model were likely to favor the available  V6, with 178 lb·ft of torque (241 N·m). Overall fit/finish and quality was noticeably improved over the first-generation model.

A facelift model of the second generation was introduced in May 2008. From 2006, it was manufactured at the Žilina Plant in Slovakia. A second facelift was introduced in the UK in early 2009, only a few months after its first facelift.

The Sportage was named as one of the most reliable vehicles from the 2009 Consumer Reports reliability survey. The Kia Sportage ranked second in the "20 least expensive 2009 vehicles to insure" list by Insure.com. According to research, the Sportage is one of the least expensive vehicles to insure.

First facelift

Second facelift

Safety

The second-generation Sportage earned a top rating of five stars in crash tests by the National Highway Traffic Safety Administration. However, the Insurance Institute for Highway Safety (IIHS) rated it only “acceptable” for frontal and side impact crash protection and “poor” for roof strength.

Third generation (SL; 2010) 

The SL series Sportage was released to Asian and European markets in April 2010, the North and Central American markets in August 2010, and the Australian market in October 2010, for the January 2011 model year. In China, it was released by Dongfeng Yueda Kia in October 2010 and called the Sportage R, and was to be built and marketed alongside the previous generation rather than as a replacement for it.

The Sportage won the 2011 Car of the Year (originally "Auto roku 2011 na Slovensku") in Slovakia and "Truck of the Year" nomination of International Car of the Year. It was top of the JD Power Survey for 2012, the only car in the survey to score five stars across all categories, from mechanical reliability to ownership costs and the dealer experience. In South Africa, it took the 2013 Standard Bank People's Wheels Award for "SUVs and Crossovers – City & Suburban".

Facelift 
The third generation received a facelift for the 2014 model year that included a new grille with a redesigned Kia logo, LED tail lights and redesigned alloy wheels.

Safety

Euro NCAP
The Sportage in its standard European configuration received 5 stars from Euro NCAP in 2010.

IIHS
The third-generation Sportage received a "Top Safety Pick" rating from the Insurance Institute for Highway Safety in the United States. Earning the award became tougher in 2010 when IIHS added the rollover crash test, which measures roof strength and is twice as stringent as the federal requirement. To pass this test, a vehicle's roof must be able to withstand the force of three times the vehicle's weight (acceptable rating). The federal standard requires a roof to hold 1.5 times the vehicle's weight.

Fourth generation (QL; 2015) 
Kia unveiled its newly redesigned Sportage at the Frankfurt Motor Show in September 2015, and brought it to market in 2016 (as a 2017 model in North America). The company said the contrasting sharp edges and smooth surfaces were inspired by modern fighter jets.

There are three gasoline engines, as well as one diesel engine in the line-up. The gasoline options are a 1.6-liter, 2.0-liter or 2.4-liter, offering around 97 kW/161 N⋅m, 120 kW/200 N⋅m and 138 kW/241 N⋅m respectively, while the diesel is a 2.0-liter turbo that will produce around 135 kW/400 N⋅m. A 130 kW/265 N⋅m 1.6 T-GDi turbo-gasoline with an optional seven-speed dual-clutch automatic, and a 136 kW/400Nm 2.0 R-Series diesel. Front- (FWD) and all-wheel drive (AWD) configurations are available.

In North America, the new Sportage is offered with three trim levels (LX, EX, and SX). Much like the previous model, it is available with two inline-four engine choices, a naturally aspirated 2.4-liter and a turbocharged 2.0-liter. Both engines are mated to a six-speed automatic transmission.

Facelift

Safety 
The Latin American Sportage has ventilated front disc brakes and solid ones in the rear.

Latin NCAP
The Korean-made Sportage in its most basic Latin American configuration with 2 airbags and no ESC received 0 stars from Latin NCAP in 2021 (similar to Euro NCAP 2014).

Euro NCAP
The Sportage in its standard European configuration received 5 stars from Euro NCAP in 2015.

IIHS

2017
The 2017 Sportage received a "Top Safety Pick" rating from the Insurance Institute for Highway Safety.

2022
The 2022 Sportage was tested by the IIHS and its top trim received a Top Safety Pick award:

Awards 
The Sportage won the 2016 Red Dot Award for Car Design.

Kia KX5 (Chinese version) 
In China, the fourth generation Sportage was sold as the Kia KX5, the third generation model was sold alongside as the Sportage R, while the Kia Sportage name was used on a separate model developed from the second generation Hyundai ix35 chassis and also sold alongside.

The Kia KX5 received a facelift in 2019 conducted by Dongfeng Yueda Kia that would exclusively be sold in China only.

Available from March 2019, the front fascia was completely restyled with headlamps integrated with the grille and the rear end of the KX5 was also slightly redesigned for the Chinese market. Despite the exclusively restyled exterior, the wheels of the Chinese version are the same as the ones on the international Kia Sportage facelift.

Fifth generation (NQ5; 2021) 
The fifth-generation Sportage was unveiled on 8 June 2021, with specifications revealed in July 2021. Based on the brand’s latest N3 platform, Kia developed two versions of the Sportage with different body length and wheelbase depending on the market.

The model is equipped with a Terrain Mode that automatically adjusts various settings depending on conditions, including snow, mud, and sand. It also features electric control suspension (ECS) on some models that provides continuous damping control in real-time. Hybrid and plug-in hybrid models will also feature an E-Handling system. lt is also equipped with a more compact shift-by-wire transmission dial for the automatic model.

The vehicle has also been equipped with updated safety systems such as autonomous emergency braking (AEB), navigation-augmented adaptive cruise control, lane centring assist and advanced blind-spot collision-avoidance assistance system.

Markets

Europe 
The short-wheelbase, European-spec fifth-generation Sportage was announced in September 2021. Other differences include the deletion of a window on the rear quarter panel, and a modified front fascia.

For the European market, Kia offers several range of drivetrains that includes plug-in hybrid, hybrid, mild hybrid, and diesel engine. The PHEV version features a 1.6-liter four-cylinder T-GDi engine and a 66.9 kW permanent magnet traction electric motor with a 13.8 kWh lithium-ion battery. The whole system produces . The hybrid model with same T-GDi engine and a 44.2 kW electric motor paired with a 1.49 kWh battery and produces .

A 7-speed dual-clutch transmission is available for the 1.6-liter while a 6-speed manual transmission is standard for all variants. All European models are equipped with Stop-and-Go technology.

North America 
The long-wheelbase, fifth-generation Sportage for United States and Canada was revealed in October 2021 as a 2023 model year. It is locally produced in West Point, Georgia instead of imported from South Korea. The hybrid version is equipped with the T-GDi engine and a 44.2 kW electric motor combined with a 1.49 kWh battery that also delivers .

Australia 
The Australian market fifth-generation Sportage was released in November 2021. Imported from South Korea, it is available as a long-wheelbase model. Four variants are offered from launch, which are S, SX, SX+ and GT-Line. The base 2.0-litre petrol is front-wheel drive only with a choice of 6-speed manual or 6-speed automatic transmissions, while both the 1.6-litre turbo-petrol and 2.0-litre turbo-diesel engines are all-wheel drive models with 7-speed dual-clutch and 8-speed automatic transmissions for the petrol and diesel respectively.

Powertrain

Safety

Euro NCAP
The Sportage in its standard European configuration received 5 stars from Euro NCAP in 2022.

IIHS

The 2023 Sportage was tested by the IIHS and its top trim received a Top Safety Pick award:

Sales 
The Sportage was Kia's best selling model worldwide in 2016, overtaking the Rio.

References

External links 

2000s cars
2010s cars
All-wheel-drive vehicles
Cars introduced in 1993
Compact sport utility vehicles
Crossover sport utility vehicles
Front-wheel-drive vehicles
Sportage
Rear-wheel-drive vehicles
ANCAP small off-road
Euro NCAP small off-road
Latin NCAP small off-road